Aaartali is a lightly populated village in Bandarban, Chittagong, Bangladesh. The closest major city is Cox's Bazar and can be reached from Naikhongchari village, Naikhongchari Upazila. The village lies close by to the border with Myanmar. The main religious center is Ashartali Jame Mosque which is located in the village and the Ashartali Government Primary School is located here.

See also
Paglirpara

References

Populated places in Chittagong Division